Matali may refer to one of the following:

 Kal Matali, a village in Iran
 Mātali, charioteer of Indra in Hinduism.
 PS Bintang Muda Matali, an Indonesian football club in 2017 Liga 3 North Sulawesi
 Hadi Ariffin Bin Matali Abdul, a Sepaktakraw player for Brunei at the 2014 Asian Games
 Kitab Matali' al-Buruj, a work of Islamic mathematical astronomy translated into Chinese by Ma Yize
 Andreu Matalí, a basketball player for BC Andorra

See also
 Mətəli river, a tributary of the Vilesh
 Mary Matalin, an American political consultant
 Matalia, a synonym for the snout moth genus Stericta
 Matale District a district in Central Province, Sri Lanka.
 Matal v. Tam, a United States Supreme Court case